Michael O. Strickland (born June 8, 1971 in San Diego, California) is an American actor. He played Brad Niklaus in NBC's soap opera Sunset Beach.

External links
 

Living people
American male television actors
American male soap opera actors
1971 births